Minard is a remote village on the western shore of Loch Fyne, situated between Inveraray and Lochgilphead. Minard is a linear village with lochside bungalows which has seen extensive building. Along the A83 road to the south is a school, church, village hall and several older cottages break up the linear aspect.

Settlements
Minard was originally part of the estate of Minard Castle before it became an independent village. The nearest large settlement is Inveraray to the north east, along the A83 road, passing Furnace and Auchindrain. To the south, the A83 follows the curves on the loch, with Lochgilphead being the biggest town in the south.

Geography
Minard is located on the northwest corner of the rocky shallow circle of Achagoyle Bay.

Gallery

References

Villages in Argyll and Bute